Lake Merrimack was a glacial lake that formed during the late Pleistocene epoch. After the Laurentide Ice Sheet retreated, glacial ice melt accumulated at the terminal moraine and blocked up the Merrimack River, creating the narrow lake. The lake extended from Manchester to Plymouth, New Hampshire. It is unknown when the lake was drained.

Lake Hitchcock is an important part of the geology of New Hampshire. It experienced annual layering of sediments, or varves: silt and sand in the summertime (due to glacial meltwater) and clay in the wintertime (as the lake froze).

See also
Lake Winnipesaukee
Champlain Sea
Lake Albany
Lake Hitchcock
Lake Stowe

References

External links
Information on the Pemigewasset River

Former lakes of the United States
Merrimack River
Lakes of New Hampshire
Proglacial lakes
Geology of New Hampshire
Glacial lakes of the United States